Dastjerd (also known as  Dastgerd, Dastgird, and Dastjerdé Jarghooyeh) is a village in Jarghooyeh Rural District, Jarghooyeh Olya District, Isfahan County, Isfahan Province, Iran. At the 2006 census, its population was 1,610, in 477 families.

References 

Populated places in Isfahan County